Franco-Celtic can refer to:

Brittany
Culture of Brittany
Breton mythology
the Matter of Britain in medieval French literature
 (claims of) Gaulish remnants in French culture

See also
Modern Celts